HD 220773 is a 7th-magnitude star approximately 165 light years away in the constellation of Pegasus.

The survey in 2015 have ruled out the existence of any additional stellar companions at projected distances from 31 to 337 astronomical units.

Planetary system
The star is orbited by an exoplanet discovered in 2012. It is around 1.45 times the mass of Jupiter, orbiting very eccentric orbit with semimajor axis of around 5 AU and taking 10.2 years to complete an orbit. If additional inner terrestrial planets do exist in HD 220773 system, these must have eccentric orbits for planetary system to remain stable.

References 

Durchmusterung objects
220773
115697
Pegasus (constellation)
Planetary systems with one confirmed planet
G-type main-sequence stars
J23262744+0838376